Michael Park School is a Waldorf school located in Auckland, New Zealand

The founding of Michael Park School and Kindergarten arose out of a community vision for Rudolf Steiner education in Auckland which culminated in the school opening on the present site in 1979, beginning with a kindergarten and lower school classes. Today Michael Park is an integrated Area School, providing seamless education for students from Playgroup (children aged 2–3 years), Nursery (2½ - 4 years), Kindergarten (4–6 years), lower school (6–14 years) to high school (students aged 14–18 years). The Steiner School refers to the Year 2 to Year 13 as Class 1 to Class 12.

Steiner's Philosophy 
Unlike 'conventional' state schools, the Steiner philosophy encourages a slightly later development, and a more creative environment.

Another unique aspect of Michael Park is their keen eye for aesthetics. The belief is that more graceful architecture will be beneficial to student's learning, meaning that there are less right angles in the school buildings and more curves.

Independent Study
One of the key things making Rudolf Steiner schools unique is the year-long project of each and every 7th Form/Year 13 student. The student is encouraged to learn or develop a skill, complete an exercise and assist the community. Some recent projects have included: learning to play a musical instrument, making a short film, learning authorship or painting, restoration/building of cars, boats, etc.

The student study is assessed on many levels including the presentation of an oral speech, and development of records (i.e., keeping a diary or their efforts) and compiling a visual display to represent their work and what they've learned over the course of the year.

The final result of the Independent Study contributes substantially to their Steiner certificate results for the year.

Qualifications 
This is a state integrated school (i.e., they are largely funded by Government subsidy). This way, Michael Park School students can participate in both government standard assessment, NCEA as well as Steiner School Certificate. Currently Steiner School Certificate is offered at Level 1.

Sporting success

Michael Park has had an unusually high proportion of students representing New Zealand in sport, particularly lacrosse. Their school team, the MPS Storm, contained eight members of the Under-19 New Zealand Men's Lacrosse team, including the captain, Toby Delamore.

See also 
Curriculum of the Waldorf schools
Rudolf Steiner
Anthroposophy

References

Five Reasons Why Parents Choose a Waldorf Education for Their Child
For creativity, capability and resilience, Steiner schools work
Tablets out, imagination in
Te Kete Ipurangi
Education Review Office report

Educational institutions established in 1979
Primary schools in Auckland
Secondary schools in Auckland
Waldorf schools in New Zealand
1979 establishments in New Zealand